The Chaetiliidae are a family of isopod crustaceans in the suborder Valvifera, comprising these genera:
Austrochaetilia Poore, 1978
Chaetilia Dana, 1849
Chiridotea Harger, 1878
Chiriscus Richardson, 1911
Glyptonotus Eights, 1852
Macrochiridothea Ohlin, 1901
Maoridotea Jones & Fenwick, 1978
Parachiridotea Daguerre de Hureaux & Elkaïm, 1972
† Proidotea Racovitza & Sevastos, 1910
Saduria Adams, 1852
Saduriella Holthuis, 1964
Stegidotea Poore, 1985
Symmius Richardson, 1904

References

External links
Chaetiliidae Dana, 1849, Australian Isopoda: Families

Valvifera
Crustacean families
Taxa named by James Dwight Dana